The A1 highway (Riga (Baltezers) - Border of Estonia (Ainaži)), also known as the Tallinn highway is a national road in Latvia, which connects the Riga bypass with the Estonian border at Ainaži. The highway continues in Estonia as highway 4 until Tallinn. A1 is fully covered in asphalt, and its length in Latvia is 101,7 km. The highway is part of European route E67 and, starting from Lilaste until the Estonian border, does not move further than 6 km from the coast of the Baltic sea.

On the Saulkrasti bypass and other sections, the speed limit outside of populated areas is 100 km/h in summer, and 90 km/h in winter. The permitted speed along Ādaži is 80 km/h, in all other sections outside the populated areas the permitted speed is 90 km/h.

Traffic 
In the section until the bridge over Gauja, the road is used by about 27,000 cars a day, until the end of the Saulkrasti bypass, it's used by about 9,000 cars a day, and in the remaining part until the border, traffic intenstity reaches no more than 7,000 cars a day. Overall, the average AADT on the A1 in 2016 was 10655 cars per day.

There are 7 stationary speed cameras installed on the highway. In 2023, it is planned to start using average speed control radars in Latvia, one of which will be located before the Saulkrasti turn, in the section 13.4 - 20.0 km.

History 
After Latvia's accession to the European Union in 2004, the first six kilometers until the intersection with P1 were reconstructed, widening the carriageway to 11.5 meters wide (in some places up to 12 meters), constructing sidewalks and bicycle lanes, reducing the number of exits, constructing parallel traffic roads, and reconstructing the bridge over the railway. In the same year, the section from the Gauja bridge until Lilaste was reconstructed. In this section too, the carriageway was widened to 11.5 meters wide, intersections with the most important access roads were reconstructed, and a pedestrian/cyclist bridge was built over the highway.

From July 2005 to September 2007, the construction of the Saulkrasti bypass took place. As part of the project, twenty kilometers of new roads, seven two-level road overpasses, two railway bridges, two pedestrian tunnels, several noise barriers, 13 km of access roads, as well as almost five kilometers of bicycle paths were built. The total cost of the project was 113 million euros, of which 36% (40 million euros) was co-financed by the EU Cohesion Fund. The 40-kilometer section between the Saulkrasti bypass and Svētciems was also reconstructed. In the course of the construction works, the most important intersections were reconstructed, and a three-kilometer-long footpath was also built.

In January of 2015, a tender was announced for the surface restoration of the A1 section Riga-Ādaži (0.0-6.3 km), and in February, reconstruction of the section Salacgrīva-Estonian border (89.4-101.4 km) was announced.

In May 2018, the restoration of the road surface was started in a 33-kilometer section from Dunta to Svētciems. The project cost a total of 5,35 million euros, which was fully financed by the state budget.

In June 2020, the restoration of the road surface on the Saulkrasti began. The construction works were carried out by SIA Via for a contract price of 2.2 million euros, which was fully financed by the state budget.

In order to relieve Baltezers and Ādaži from the heavy traffic, a new Skulte - Vangaži highway was considered in 2021, which would be built parallel to the Rail Baltica railway on the eastern side of the Ādaži military base. The new highway would have separate lanes, and a speed limit of 130 km/h. However, due to high construction prices, significant impact on the environment and strong public objections, in August 2022 VSIA Latvijas valsts ceļi decided not to proceed with the project.

Future 
After a 2020 inspection of the Salaca bridge in Salacgrīva, it was found that the bridge, which was built in 1960, is in a critical state. Therefore, for safety reasons, traffic across the bridge is currently regulated by traffic lights, there are weight restrictions, and a distance of 30m must be kept between vehicles. It is expected that the development of the construction project for a new bridge will be completed at the end of 2022, so that construction can start in 2023. During the reconstruction of the bridge, a 6m wide temporary bypass bridge will be built. The width of the new bridge will be 14.5m, with two 4m wide driving lanes and two 2.5m wide sidewalks on the sides of the roadway. The construction project is currently being carried out by SIA Projekts 3; the contract price is 185 thousand euros, 30% of which (55 thousand euros) is financed by the municipality of Salacgriva.

Due to heavy traffic, it is planned to construct a two-level interchange on the highway near Ādaži at the intersection with P1, in order to provide vehicles, pedestrians, and cyclists with safe and unobstructed access to Carnikava and Ādaži. The development of the construction project began in 2022. It is planned that the construction of the interchange will take place no earlier than in 2024.

Crossing roads 

 A2
 P1
 P6
 P53
 P11
 P12
 P15

Cities and towns nearby 

 Riga
 Baltezers
 Ādaži
 Lilaste
 Saulkrasti
 Zvejniekciems
 Dunte
 Jelgavkrasti
 Svētciems
 Salacgrīva
 Kuiviži
 Ainaži

Gallery

References

External links
Autoceļš A1 in Google Maps

A01